This is a list of cities and towns in the Australian state of New South Wales with a population of 5,000 or greater as at the 2021 Census. The below figures represent the populations of the contiguous built-up areas of each city or town.

Notes

See also

 Demographics of Australia
 List of cities in Australia
 List of places in the Northern Territory by population
 List of places in Queensland by population
 List of places in South Australia by population
 List of places in Tasmania by population
 List of places in Victoria by population
 List of places in Western Australia by population

References

New South Wales
New South Wales by population
Cities by population
Cities in New South Wales